Blanca María Félix Castro (born 25 March 1996), known as Blanca Félix, is a Mexican football goalkeeper who currently plays for Guadalajara of the Liga MX Femenil.

Club career

Guadalajara (2017–present) 

Blanca Félix was one of the first three goalkeepers to ever play for Club Deportivo Guadalajara in the first Liga Femenil MX season.
She started the tournament as the third goalkeeper following Karen Gómez and Ana Ruvalcaba as the first and second goalkeepers. Karen Gómez was then the starter goalkeeper until the second game when she suffered an injury and had to be replaced by Ana Rubalcaba in the 10' minute. For the next three games Ruvalcaba was Luis Camacho's first option and Blanca Félix was the substitute goalkeeper until September 3, when she made her debut against Club Santos Laguna in the matchday 6. Since then she became Guadalajara's starter goalkeeper and one of the fans favorite players.

After the Apertura 2017, Félix was named the best goalkeeper of the tournament, and was part of the Apertura 2017 Team of The Season.

International
On 28 November 2017, Félix received her first call-up to the Mexico national team.

Career statistics

Club

Honours and achievements

Club
Guadalajara
 Liga MX Femenil: Apertura 2017

Individual
 Liga MX Femenil Team of The Season: Apertura 2017

References

External links
 
 Blanca Felix at C.D. Guadalajara Femenil 

1996 births
Living people
Footballers from Sinaloa
Mexican women's footballers
Women's association football goalkeepers
Mexico women's youth international footballers
Liga MX Femenil players
C.D. Guadalajara (women) footballers
Mexican footballers